Sir Victor William Michael Drury OBE (5 August 1926 – 11 June 2014) was a British medical doctor who was professor of General Practice at the University of Birmingham, and in 1985 was elected president of the Royal College of General Practitioners.

References

Further reading

1926 births
2014 deaths
20th-century British medical doctors
British general practitioners